
Year 567 (DLXVII) was a common year starting on Saturday (link will display the full calendar) of the Julian calendar. The denomination 567 for this year has been used since the early medieval period, when the Anno Domini calendar era became the prevalent method in Europe for naming years.

Events 
 By place 
 Europe 
 The Lombard–Gepid War (567) ends with a Lombard-Avar victory, and the annihilation of the Gepids.
 Sigebert I, king of Austrasia, marries Brunhilda, and his half brother Chilperic I marries Galswintha, both daughters of the Visigothic king Athanagild.
 King Charibert I dies without an heir; his realm (region Neustria and Aquitaine) is divided between his brothers Guntram, Sigebert I and Chilperic I. 
 Liuva I succeeds his predecessor Athanagild after an interregnum of five months and becomes king of the Visigoths.

China
Three Disasters of Wu: Emperor Wu Di of the Northern Zhou dynasty initiates the second persecution of Buddhists in China. This persecution continues until he is succeeded by his son Emperor Xuan.

 By topic 
 Religion 
 The Second Council of Tours is held. It decrees that any cleric found in bed with his wife will be excommunicated.
 John III, patriarch of Constantinople, organizes a compromise between the Chalcedonians and Monophysites.

Births 
 Ingund, wife of Hermenegild (or 568)

Deaths 
 June 5 – Theodosius I, patriarch of Alexandria
 Athanagild, king of the Visigoths
 Charibert I, king of the Franks
 Cissa, king of the South Saxons
 Cunimund, king of the Gepids

References